Line 6 of Zhengzhou Metro is a rapid transit line in Zhengzhou.

History

West section of Phase 1
The West section of Phase 1 is 16.7 km in length with 10 stations, from Jiayu to Changzhuang. The section opened on 30 September 2022.

East section of Phase 1
The section from Changzhuang to Qinghuafuzhong will open in late 2023.

Stations

West section of Phase 1

References

Zhengzhou Metro lines
2022 establishments in China